Gabriel Adonis Norambuena Moraga (born May 7, 2003), nicknamed Nora, is a Chilean professional footballer who plays as a left winger for Chilean Primera División club Unión Española.

Club career
A product of Unión Española youth system, Norambuena made his professional debut in the 2020 Chilean Primera División match versus Cobresal on February 15, 2021, a meeting that he played 19 minutes in during a 4–1 defeat. In October 2021, he signed his first contract as a professional footballer at the age of 18.

International career
In December 2021, Norambuena represented Chile U20 at the friendly tournament Copa Rául Coloma Rivas, playing the three matches, and at four friendly matches against Paraguay U20 and Peru U20 on 2022. In September 2022, he made two appearances in the Costa Cálida Supercup. In 2023, he made four appearances in the South American U-20 Championship.

Personal life
He has stated that his enthusiasm for playing football comes from his family, as his grandfather, uncles and brothers have all played it as well as his mother is a sportswoman. His football model is Gareth Bale.

References

External links
 
 Gabriel Norambuena at playmakerstats.com (English version of ceroacero.es)

Living people
2003 births
Footballers from Santiago
Chilean footballers
Chile under-20 international footballers
Unión Española footballers
Chilean Primera División players
Association football forwards